Arith is a commune in the Savoie department in the Auvergne-Rhône-Alpes region in south-eastern France.

Geography
The Chéran river forms most of the commune's eastern border.

See also
Communes of the Savoie department

References

Communes of Savoie